<noinclude>
Heloise may refer to:
 Héloïse (1100?–1164), French writer, philosopher and abbess and wife of Peter Abelard
 Heloise (columnist) (Kiah Michelle Cruse, born 1951), American advice columnist, daughter of the original "Hints from Heloise" author
 Heloise Bowles Cruse (1919–1977), American advice columnist, the original author of "Hints from Heloise"
 Heloise (Jimmy Two-Shoes), a character on Canadian animated children's TV series Jimmy Two-Shoes
 Héloïse Guérin (born 1989), French fashion model
 Heloise McCeney or La Belle Titcomb (1876–?), an American vaudeville performer known as the Parisian Dancer
 Heloise Williams, lead singer of New York punk band Heloise and the Savoir Faire

People with the surname
 Laurent Héloïse (born 1985), French professional football player

See also 
 Eloise (disambiguation)
 

French feminine given names